is a Japanese judoka. He was former world champion of Lightweight category.

He is from Umi, Fukuoka. He began judo at the age of a 4th grader. After graduation from Tokai University, He belonged to International Budo University, Tokyo University and so on as a coach.

He won the gold medal of world championships in 1983 and participate Olympic Games in 1984.

As of 2009, Nakanishi coaches judo at his alma mater, Tokai University, where he previously studied as an undergraduate.

References

External links
 

Japanese male judoka
Olympic judoka of Japan
Tokai University alumni
Judoka at the 1984 Summer Olympics
Sportspeople from Fukuoka Prefecture
1958 births
Living people
20th-century Japanese people
21st-century Japanese people